Anisimovo is a rural locality (a village) in Pervomayskoye Rural Settlement, Chagodoshchensky District, Vologda Oblast, Russia. The population was 224 as of 2002. There are 9 streets.

Geography 
Pervomaysky is the nearest rural locality.

References 

Rural localities in Chagodoshchensky District